Marina Viktorovna Logvinenko (née Dobrancheva, born 1 September 1961) is a Russian sport shooter, specializing in the pistol events.

Biography
Logvinenko was born in Shakhty. She competed at four Olympic Games and won five Olympic medals. At 1992 Olympics, she won both the 10 metre air pistol and 25 metre pistol event. She is the only woman and one of five athletes to win two individual shooting gold medals during one Olympics.

Olympic results

References 
 Profile on issfnews.com
 

1961 births
Living people
People from Shakhty
Soviet female sport shooters
Russian female sport shooters
ISSF pistol shooters
Olympic shooters of the Soviet Union
Olympic shooters of the Unified Team
Olympic shooters of Russia
Shooters at the 1988 Summer Olympics
Shooters at the 1992 Summer Olympics
Shooters at the 1996 Summer Olympics
Shooters at the 2000 Summer Olympics
Olympic bronze medalists for the Soviet Union
Olympic gold medalists for the Unified Team
Olympic silver medalists for Russia
Olympic bronze medalists for Russia
Olympic medalists in shooting
Medalists at the 1996 Summer Olympics
Medalists at the 1992 Summer Olympics
Medalists at the 1988 Summer Olympics
Sportspeople from Rostov Oblast